Logansport is the name of some places in the United States:
Logansport, Indiana
Logansport, Louisiana
Logansport, West Virginia